Puffin Island (Oileán na gCánóg in Irish) is an uninhabited steep rocky island lying off the coast of the Iveragh Peninsula, County Kerry, Ireland.

Geography 
The island is about 1.5 km long and 0.7 km wide, and rises to 213 metres. It is separated from the mainland by Puffin Sound, which is only about 250 metres across. Day visits to the island from Valentia can be arranged. It lies off the northern headland of St. Finian's Bay.

Nature conservation 
Puffin Island holds important populations of several seabird species, including Atlantic puffins, Manx shearwaters and European storm-petrels, and was acquired as a nature reserve by the Irish Wildbird Conservancy (now BirdWatch Ireland) in the early 1980s.

History 
The island also has some signs of ancient human habitation, and it has attracted the interest of archaeologists.

References

Photo gallery

External links 

 

Islands of County Kerry
Protected areas of County Kerry
Marilyns of Ireland
Uninhabited islands of Ireland
Nature reserves in the Republic of Ireland
Important Bird Areas of the Republic of Ireland
Gaeltacht places in County Kerry